Sandy Beach is a hamlet in the town of Grand Island in Erie County, New York, United States.  It is located to the east of Buckhorn Island State Park.

Sandy Beach is a community of homes built in the late 1940s.  It is also home to the Sandy Beach Yacht Club and the Beach House Restaurant.

References

Hamlets in New York (state)
Hamlets in Erie County, New York